Beaver Creek is a large creek in Lorain County, Ohio, USA. It flows through the township (and the village) of Amherst, and through the western end of the corporation-limits of the City of Lorain, and into Lake Erie. 
 The entire Beaver Creek watershed is composed of two main branches (originally called "Big Beaver" and "Little Beaver"), and several small tributaries. 
 The area at the mouth/outlet of this creek has been historically known as "Oak Point". [The extensive sand beach to the immediate west of the mouth, has been called "Hole-in-the-Wall" — named for the former access routes onto the beach, via a bygone passageway there through the railroad-embankment — and also via an existing legal-right-of-way through the "Claus double-tunnel" at Quarry Creek, although presently the "Hole-in-the-Wall" beach no longer extends that far westerly. (There have been unsuccessful past local-governmental proposals to restore the whole length of the Hole-in-the-Wall beach, and re-open that "Claus double-tunnel" to the public.) ]
 Beaver Creek has an important history in the early pioneer-settlement of this land-area of Ohio ( including the "Beaver Creek Settlement" of 1810, and, in particular, the later development of the village of Amherst.  In fact, those same pioneer-settlers are said to have named this creek solely in honor of their former homeland in western Pennsylvania, ( and therefore it is uncertain if there were also a significant number of beaver inhabiting this creek, which some local-historians have later asserted).
 Prior to the arrival of the pioneer-settlers from their former Beaver Falls (PA) area, this creek seems to have been known as the "Riviere en Grys".
 Beaver Creek's main branch follows these basic co-ordinates:  41.2814393 -82.2882163 / 41.3750450 -82.2393232 / 41.4361526 -82.2498785

See also
List of rivers of Ohio

References

Rivers of Lorain County, Ohio
Rivers of Ohio
Tributaries of Lake Erie